Star Valley is a town in Gila County, Arizona, United States, incorporated in 2005. Before incorporation, it was a census-designated place (CDP). As of the 2010 census the population of the town was 2,310.

Geography
Star Valley is located in northern Gila County at  (34.254353, -111.257165). It is bordered to the west by the town of Payson. Arizona State Route 260 passes through Star Valley, leading west  into Payson and east  to Show Low.

The town was incorporated as the Town of Diamond Star, but changed its name to Star Valley in 2006.

Demographics

As of the census of 2000, there were 1,536 people, 677 households, and 421 families residing in the CDP. The racial makeup of the CDP was 93.6% White, 0.1% Black or African American, 0.7% Native American, 0.3% Asian, 0.1% Pacific Islander, 3.8% from other races, and 1.6% from two or more races.  10.3% of the population were Hispanic or Latino of any race.

There were 677 households, out of which 24.4% had children under the age of 18 living with them, 51.1% were married couples living together, 7.7% had a female householder with no husband present, and 37.8% were non-families. 32.1% of all households were made up of individuals, and 15.1% had someone living alone who was 65 years of age or older.  The average household size was 2.27 and the average family size was 2.86.

In the CDP, the population was spread out, with 22.9% under the age of 18, 6.0% from 18 to 24, 21.9% from 25 to 44, 28.1% from 45 to 64, and 21.2% who were 65 years of age or older.  The median age was 44 years. For every 100 females, there were 98.4 males.  For every 100 females age 18 and over, there were 95.2 males.

The median income for a household in the CDP was $27,375, and the median income for a family was $32,045. Males had a median income of $30,966 versus $20,729 for females. The per capita income for the CDP was $19,414.  About 4.7% of families and 9.7% of the population were below the poverty line, including 7.4% of those under age 18 and 6.5% of those age 65 or over.

Transportation

The Payson Senior Center operates the Beeline Bus, which provides local bus service between Payson and Star Valley.

Government
Star Valley uses a council-manager government form with a town council. As of February 2020, the mayor is Gary Coon and the current town manager is Timothy Grier.

References

External links
 Town of Star Valley official website

Towns in Gila County, Arizona
Populated places of the Mogollon Rim
Former census-designated places in Arizona
Populated places established in 2005